José Orengo (born April 26, 1976) is an Argentine former rugby union footballer and current coach. He has played club rugby in Argentina and France, as well as represented Argentina national rugby union team in 37 occasions. He is the current coach of Argentina A team.

Biography
Orengo was born at Rosario.

Having attended the Goethe Schule (German School) for elementary education, Orengo then transferred to the Politechnical High School, graduating 1993. At that time, he was already playing rugby at Club Atlético del Rosario (Plaza) alongside his brothers. He set off studying Engineering but was swiftly drafted to the Pumitas. From there he moved on to play for Los Pumas. His debut game as a Puma was against Uruguay on September 18, 1996. He played in the 1999 and 2003 Rugby World Cup, his last appearance for Argentina was Against Wales in 2004.

Orengo played club rugby for Grenoble and Perpignan in France. Eventually, he returned to Rosario where he established himself as an Engineer working at the Dolphines Guaraní towers project (two 45 storey buildings in construction as of September 2007) among others. He is married and a father. Currently he takes part in the coaching of junior Argentina squads. He has featured in several TV shows broadcast for cable TV in Rosario, where he was asked to analyze the Pumas phenomenon. He remains in the shortlist to be appointed to a Pumas coaching position some time in the future.

External links
Rugbytime profile 
RWC2003 profile

1976 births
Living people
Sportspeople from Rosario, Santa Fe
Argentine rugby union coaches
Argentine rugby union players
Rugby union centres
Argentina international rugby union players
Argentina international rugby sevens players